Helmuth Rilling (born 29 May 1933) is a German choral conductor and an academic teacher. He is the founder of the Gächinger Kantorei (1954), the Bach-Collegium Stuttgart (1965), the Oregon Bach Festival (1970), the Internationale Bachakademie Stuttgart (1981) and other Bach Academies worldwide, as well as the "Festival Ensemble Stuttgart" (2001) and the "Junges Stuttgarter Bach Ensemble" (2011). He taught choral conducting at the Frankfurt Musikhochschule from 1965 to 1989 and led the Frankfurter Kantorei from 1969 to 1982.

Education
Rilling was born into a musical family. He received his early training at the Protestant Seminaries in Württemberg. From 1952 to 1955 he studied organ, composition, and choral conducting at the Stuttgart College of Music. He completed his studies with Fernando Germani in Rome and at the Accademia Musicale Chigiana in Siena.

While still a student in 1954, he founded his first choir, the Gächinger Kantorei. Starting in 1957, he was organist and choirmaster at the Stuttgart Gedächtniskirche, conducting the choir Figuralchor der Gedächtniskirche Stuttgart. From 1963 to 1966, and taught organ and choral at the Spandauer Kirchenmusikschule, conducting the Spandauer Kantorei (Spandau chorale).

Career 
In 1967 he studied with Leonard Bernstein in New York and in the same year was appointed professor of choral conducting at the Frankfurt University of Music and Performing Arts, a post which he held until 1985. In 1969, he took over as conductor of the Frankfurter Kantorei (Frankfurt Choir). Since 1965 he has conducted the Bach-Collegium Stuttgart, which often performs with the Gächinger Kantorei. He has toured widely with both ensembles.

He is well known for his performances of the music of Johann Sebastian Bach and his contemporaries. He is the first person to have twice prepared and recorded (on modern instruments) the complete choral works of J. S. Bach, a monumental task involving well over 1,000 pieces of music - spanning 170 compact discs. He has also recorded many romantic and classical choral and orchestral works, including the works of Johannes Brahms. In 1988 he conducted the world premiere of the Messa per Rossini that he also conducted at the Rheingau Musik Festival in 2001, where he has traditionally conducted the final concert.

Rilling co-founded the Oregon Bach Festival in 1970, and served as its artistic director until 2013.  He also co-founded and led the Internationale Bachakademie Stuttgart since 1981. In 2001 Rilling created the Festival Ensemble to be part of the European Music Festival Stuttgart ("Musikfest Stuttgart").  Rilling became the Festival Conductor and lecturer at the Toronto Bach Festival in 2004.

Rilling was a teacher of chorale conducting at the Frankfurt Musikhochschule from 1965 to 1989.

Recordings and awards 
Rilling's recording of Krzysztof Penderecki's Credo, commissioned and performed by the Oregon Bach Festival, won the 2001 Grammy Award for best choral performance. He received the Bach Medal in 2004. In 2008, Rilling was awarded the Sanford Award by the Yale School of Music at Yale University. He was the 2011 recipient of the Herbert von Karajan Music Prize

For Rilling's 75th birthday, his record label Hänssler Classic released his entire Bach edition on iPod.

References

External links

 Helmuth Rilling / Gründer der Internationalen Bachakademie  on the website of the Internationale Bachakademie Stuttgart 
Helmuth Rilling (Conductor, Organ) on bach-cantatas.com
vita - fotos of Helmuth Rilling 
Interview with Helmuth Rilling by Bruce Duffie, 2 March 2000

1933 births
Living people
German choral conductors
German male conductors (music)
Grammy Award winners
Musicians from Oregon
Musicians from Stuttgart
Bach conductors
Knights Commander of the Order of Merit of the Federal Republic of Germany
Recipients of the Order of Merit of Baden-Württemberg
Herbert von Karajan Music Prize winners
21st-century German conductors (music)
21st-century German male musicians
Kirchenmusikdirektor